This is a list of English language Family Guy DVDs from regions 1, 2, and 4.

Season releases

Region 1 (U.S. and Canada)

Region 2 (UK and Ireland) and Region 4 (Australia, New Zealand and Mexico)

Special episodes
The following are special extended episodes produced for the direct-to-DVD market, and as such are not included in the above season sets.

Compilations

Anthologies

Home media

Notes

References

Home video releases
Family Guy